Rahmani may refer to:
 Rahmani, Khuzestan
 Rahmani-ye Jadid, Khuzestan Province
 Rahmani, South Khorasan